Janne Jokila (born April 22, 1982) is a Finnish ice hockey player who plays professionally for Milton Keynes Lightning in the English Premier Ice Hockey League. His former teams include HC TPS of the SM-liiga and Syracuse Crunch of the AHL.

His career began with HC TPS before moving to North America in 2002 after taking part in the 2000 NHL Entry Draft, being selected by the Columbus Blue Jackets, although he would never go on to play in the NHL. He returned to Finland in 2005 and moved to the UK in 2012.

Jokila has represented the Finland men's national ice hockey team at the Under 18's World Championship in 2000 and the Under 20's World Championship in 2002.

His brother, Jarmo Jokila, is also a professional ice hockey player with HC Banská Bystrica in the Slovak Extraliga.

Career statistics

Regular season and playoffs

International

References

External links
 Janne Jokila Elite Prospects Stats
 Janne Jokila NHL.com Stats

Finnish ice hockey left wingers
Milton Keynes Lightning players
Columbus Blue Jackets draft picks
Living people
1982 births
Sportspeople from Turku
Finnish expatriate ice hockey players in England
Finnish expatriate ice hockey players in the United States
Finnish expatriate ice hockey players in Sweden